Cristina Ioana Bujin (born 12 April 1988, Constanța) is a Romanian triple jumper.

She was born in Constanța. She was a prolific competitor at youth and junior events in her early career. She finished fifth in the long jump at the 2003 World Youth Championships. She then only reached triple jump finals, winning the bronze medal at the 2005 World Youth Championships, placing sixth at the 2006 World Junior Championships and third again at the 2007 European Junior Championships.

She competed at the 2007 European Indoor Championships, the 2008 World Indoor Championships and the 2009 European Indoor Championships without reaching the final, before finally succeeding at the 2009 World Championships where she finished seventh in the final. She also won the silver medal at the 2009 European U23 Championships.

Her personal best is 14.42 metres, achieved on 1 August 2009 in București. On the next day she managed 6.38 metres in the long jump, that too a personal best.

Competition record

References

1988 births
Living people
Romanian female triple jumpers
Romanian female long jumpers
Olympic athletes of Romania
Athletes (track and field) at the 2012 Summer Olympics
Athletes (track and field) at the 2016 Summer Olympics
World Athletics Championships athletes for Romania
Universiade medalists in athletics (track and field)
People from Constanța
Universiade bronze medalists for Romania
Medalists at the 2011 Summer Universiade